Lieutenant Cecil Robert Thompson was a South African World War I flying ace credited with six aerial victories.

Thompson served two and a half years in the ground forces in both the East and West African campaigns against the Germans. He then transferred into the Royal Flying Corps in August 1917. In April 1918, he joined 84 Squadron on the Western Front as a Royal Aircraft Factory SE.5a pilot. He spent June and July in hospital. Then, on 4 August 1918, he destroyed an Albatros D.V; on the 7th, drove down a Pfalz D.III out of control; on the 11th, destroyed a Fokker D.VII. Then, for his last three victories, he turned balloon buster. On 4 September, he teamed with Sidney Highwood to destroy a German observation balloon. The next day, Thompson destroyed another. On the 15th, he burned another for his final win, despite being tailed by four Fokker D.VIIs; then he was jumped by several more Fokker D.VIIs and wounded seriously in the face and shoulder. He managed to struggle back to base despite his wounds.

Honors and awards
Distinguished Flying Cross (DFC)

Lieut. Cecil Robert Thompson. (FRANCE)
  
This officer has destroyed three enemy machines and three kite balloons. At all times he displays utter disregard of personal danger, notably so on 15 September, when, in company with another machine, in face of a heavy barrage, he dived to attack a kite balloon; as he dived he was attacked from the rear by four Fokkers. Disregarding them, he continued to dive, and shot down the balloon in flames. He then, although wounded in the face and shoulder, turned and engaged the Fokkers, who had, in the meantime, been reinforced and numbered twelve. Finally, after a stern contest, he made his way back to the aerodrome and rendered his report. Supplement to the London Gazette, 3 December 1918 (31046/14326)

World War II
Thompson rejoined in 1939, transferring to the South African Air Force, later serving with 24 Bomber Squadron.

Sources of information

References
Above the Trenches: a Complete Record of the Fighter Aces and Units of the British Empire Air Forces 1915-1920. Christopher F. Shores, Norman L. R. Franks, Russell Guest. Grub Street, 1990. , .

1894 births
1973 deaths
South African people of British descent
White South African people
South African World War I flying aces
People from Kimberley, Northern Cape
Recipients of the Distinguished Flying Cross (United Kingdom)